Ken Ackerman is an American television news anchor and reporter in Portland, Oregon. Born in Dover, New Jersey, Ken attended High School in Olympia, WA and would eventually settle in the Pacific Northwest. Upon graduation in 1983 from the University of Southern California with a bachelor's degree in Sports Broadcast Journalism, Ken would begin his television career in California and then North Carolina where Ken was awarded several Associated Press awards with WITN-TV and WXII-TV in Winston-Salem. Ken made his way back to the Northwest in 1989 where he would spend the rest of his career as a fixture on Portland television beginning as a sports anchor/reporter on the NBC affiliate KGW.  In 2003 he would journey across town to Fox affiliate KPTV, where Ken would go on to earn four NW emmy nominations and an RTNDA national news directors honor as a feature reporter. In 1996 Ken was chosen to become the first host of the FOX morning show Good Day Oregon.  In 2003, ABC affiliate KATU hired Ken to host its morning show AM Northwest.  Ackerman was also hired by Comcast as the studio host of Comcast Newsmakers interviewing state political and business leaders. In 2011, Ken became the lead anchor on KRCW's "Portland's Morning News", which aired as part of the nationally broadcast Eye Opener morning program.  Ken retired from the media in 2015 and resides in Lake Oswego, OR.

References

1960s births
People from Dover, New Jersey
Living people
Television anchors from Portland, Oregon
USC Annenberg School for Communication and Journalism alumni
University of Southern California alumni